Saensak Muangsurin (แสนศักดิ์ เมืองสุรินทร์) (13 August 1950 – 16 April 2009) was a professional boxer from Phetchabun, Thailand. He was a Muay Thai fighter and professional boxer. He was WBC light welterweight champion, setting a world record by winning a world title in his 3rd professional fight. He is Thailand's heaviest world boxing champion to date.

Biography 
Saensak started fighting in Muay Thai and fought in numerous matches, some held in Japan prior to winning the world title. At the beginning of his career, he used the ring names "Saensaep Petchcharoen" (แสนแสบ เพชรเจริญ) and "Saepsuang Petchcharoen" (แสบทรวง เพชรเจริญ) as he was fighting in his native province and the neighboring ones.

He later became a famous Muay Thai fighter. He has faced many top Muay Thai fighters such as Poot Lorlek, Vicharnnoi Porntawee, Pudpadnoi Worawut, Khunpon Sakornpitak, Wisan Kraigriengyuk, Kongdej Lookbangplasroy, and Sirimongkol Luksiripat. He won the Lumpinee Stadium junior welterweight title by knocking out Sorrasak Sor Lukbookalo in just the first round in 1971.

In addition, he was also an amateur boxer at the 7th Southeast Asian Peninsular Games in Singapore in 1973. He made news every time he won by RSC until he won the gold medal.

Saensak made his formal professional boxing debut on November 16, 1974, with a first-round knockout win. He won his second fight in February 1975 by technical knockout in round 7, and challenged Perico Fernandez for the WBC light welterweight title in his third professional fight. He defeated Fernandez by technical knockout in the 8th round on July 15, 1975, to set a world record for taking the shortest time to win the world title; it had been less than a year since he made his debut in 1974.

Saensak lost his world title in his second defense against Miguel Velasquez after being disqualified in the 5th round, but quickly regained it four months later on October 29, 1976, by knocking out Velázquez in two rounds. He successfully defended the WBC belt 7 times (8 total, including his defense prior to the disqualification against Velázquez), most notably against former WBC lightweight champion Guts Ishimatsu, whom he knocked out in six rounds.

He was knocked out by Sang Hyun Kim in the 13th round to lose his world title on December 30, 1978. He fell into relative obscurity from then on, losing both of his fights in 1979, one of which was a third-round knockout loss to Thomas Hearns. His last professional fight was for the OPBF welterweight title, which he lost by decision over 12 rounds. His record was 14–6–0 (11 KOs).

In 2014 Vasyl Lomachenko tied the record, winning a world title in his third bout. Saensak still has the record for the fastest time to a world title after first professional bout, having taken 11 days less than the Ukrainian.

Personal life and death 
During the glory period he was a celebrity or even a superstar. He married a popular actress in that era, Prim Prapaporn. The couple have one son, he named his son Kriangsak "King" Mansri, just like the name of the prime minister at the time Gen. Kriangsak Chamanan.

He ended his boxing career with injuries, especially the right eye. When he retired, he was blind in his right eye. His wife divorced him, and his savings of up to 10 million baht were exhausted. Ever since, his life has been hard. He had a monthly courtesy from the WBC and other authorities in Thailand, but it was not enough to cover costs.

Saensak was admitted to Rajvithi Hospital on April 12, 2009 for liver failure and intestinal blockage. Surgery failed to improve his condition, which was complicated by Saensak being afflicted by various ailments. On April 16, Saensak died while under observation in an intensive care unit.

Awards and accomplishments

Muay Thai
 1971 Lumpinee Stadium 140 lbs Champion

Awards
 1973 King's Muay Thai Fighter of the Year

Boxing 
 1975 WBC Light welterweight Champion
 1976 WBC Light welterweight Champion (7 defenses)

Professional boxing record

Muay Thai record

|-  style="background:#fbb;"
| 1974-10-08 || Loss||align=left| Poot Lorlek|| Lumpinee Stadium || Bangkok, Thailand ||Decision || 5 || 3:00

|-  style="background:#cfc;"
| 1974-08-22 || Win ||align=left| Vicharnnoi Porntawee || Rajadamnern Stadium || Bangkok, Thailand || KO (Punches) || 3 || 

|-  style="background:#cfc;"
| 1974-07-12 || Win||align=left| Poot Lorlek|| Lumpinee Stadium || Bangkok, Thailand || Decision || 5 || 3:00

|-  style="background:#cfc;"
| 1974-05-14 || Win||align=left| Sirimongkol Luksiripat || Lumpinee Stadium || Bangkok, Thailand || KO || 2 || 

|-  style="background:#cfc;"
| 1974-05-01 || Win||align=left| Wannarong Peeramit || Rajadamnern Stadium || Bangkok, Thailand || KO || 3 || 

|-  style="background:#cfc;"
| 1974-03-28 || Win||align=left| Tae Yien-chen || Kung Fu vs Muay Thai, Rajadamnern Stadium || Bangkok, Thailand || KO (high kick) || 2 || 1:20

|-  style="background:#fbb;"
| 1974-03-12 || Loss ||align=left| Poot Lorlek|| Lumpinee Stadium || Bangkok, Thailand || Decision || 5 || 3:00

|-  style="background:#cfc;"
| 1974-02-13 || Win||align=left| Khunpol Sakornpitak || Lumpinee Stadium || Bangkok, Thailand || KO (Punches)|| 2 || 

|-  style="background:#cfc;"
| 1973-11-27|| Win ||align=left| Yoshimitsu Tamashiro || AJKA || Tokyo, Japan || KO (Knee to the body)|| 2 || 

|-  style="background:#cfc;"
| 1973-11-12|| Win ||align=left| Karawek Kwanjairuang || Rajadamnern Stadium || Bangkok, Thailand || Decision || 5 || 3:00

|-  style="background:#cfc;"
| 1973-10-27|| Win ||align=left| Huasai Sitthibunlert || Huamark Stadium || Bangkok, Thailand || KO|| 2 || 

|-  style="background:#cfc;"
| 1973-08-15|| Win ||align=left| Kongdej Lukbangplasoi || Rajadamnern Stadium || Bangkok, Thailand || KO (Punches)|| 1 || 

|-  style="background:#cfc;"
| 1973-04-03|| Win ||align=left| Buriram Sun Misakawan || Huamark Stadium || Bangkok, Thailand || KO|| 1 || 

|-  style="background:#fbb;"
| 1973-02-09|| Loss||align=left| Poot Lorlek|| Huamark Stadium || Bangkok, Thailand || Decision || 5 || 3:00

|-  style="background:#cfc;"
| 1972-10-25 || Win ||align=left| Khunpon Sakornpithak || Rajadamnern Stadium || Bangkok, Thailand || Decision || 5 || 3:00

|-  style="background:#fbb;"
| 1972-09-29 || Loss ||align=left| Vicharnnoi Porntawee || Huamark Stadium || Bangkok, Thailand || Decision || 5 || 3:00

|-  style="background:#cfc;"
| 1972-08-01 || Win ||align=left| Vicharnnoi Porntawee || Lumpinee Stadium || Bangkok, Thailand || Decision || 5 || 3:00

|-  style="background:#cfc;"
| 1972-05-15 || Win||align=left| Vison Kraigreangyuk || Lumpinee Stadium || Bangkok, Thailand || Decision || 5 || 3:00

|-  style="background:#cfc;"
| 1971-11-30 || Win||align=left| Sorasak Sor.Lukbukkalo || Lumpinee Stadium || Bangkok, Thailand || KO (Punches)|| 1 || 
|-
! style=background:white colspan=9 |

|-  style="background:#cfc;"
| 1971-10-29 || Win||align=left| Thongbai Charoenmuang || Lumpinee Stadium || Bangkok, Thailand || TKO (Doctor Stoppage)|| 3 || 

|-  style="background:#cfc;"
| 1971-09-24 || Win||align=left| Tamildong Luk-U-Thong || Lumpinee Stadium || Bangkok, Thailand || KO (Punches) || 2 || 

|-  style="background:#cfc;"
| 1971-08-24 || Win||align=left| Rittisak Sophy||  || Bangkok, Thailand || TKO|| 2 || 

|-  style="background:#cfc;"
| 1971-06-19 || Win||align=left| Suwitnoi Lukbangplasoi|| Lumpinee Stadium || Bangkok, Thailand || Decision || 5 || 3:00

|-  style="background:#cfc;"
| 1971-05-11 || Win||align=left| Charnritnoi Lookbangplasoy ||  || Bangkok, Thailand || TKO || 3 || 

|-  style="background:#cfc;"
| 1971-04-13 || Win||align=left| Wichit Lookbangplasoy || Lumpinee Stadium || Bangkok, Thailand || TKO (Punches)|| 1 || 

|-  style="background:#cfc;"
| 1971-03-24 || Win ||align=left| Wichit Lookbangplasoy ||  || Chonburi province, Thailand || TKO|| 1 ||  

|-  style="background:#fbb;"
| 1971-02-26 || Loss||align=left| Surakan Klongphajon|| Lumpinee Stadium || Bangkok, Thailand || Decision || 5 || 3:00 

|-  style="background:#fbb;"
| 1971-02-07 || Loss||align=left| Thongsuriya Isaraphap||  || Phetchaburi province, Thailand || KO|| 1 || 

|-  style="background:#cfc;"
| 1971-01-10 || Win||align=left| Runganan Napapol||  || Bangkok, Thailand || Decision || 5 || 3:00

|-  style="background:#cfc;"
| 1970-12-16 || Win||align=left| Adisak Weerawat || Rajadamnern Stadium || Bangkok, Thailand || Decision || 5 || 3:00

|-  style="background:#fbb;"
| 1970-11-20 || Loss||align=left| Khirisak Luksiripat|| Lumpinee Stadium || Bangkok, Thailand || Decision || 5 || 3:00 

|-  style="background:#cfc;"
| 1970-10-14 || Win||align=left| Isarayuth Timlaend||  Rajadamnern Stadium || Bangkok, Thailand || TKO || 4 || 

|-  style="background:#cfc;"
| 1970-09-27 || Win||align=left| Hansa Surakorsang||  Rajadamnern Stadium || Bangkok, Thailand || Decision || 5 || 3:00 

|-  style="background:#cfc;"
| 1970-09-06 || Win||align=left| Singdon Kiatpracharat||  Rajadamnern Stadium || Bangkok, Thailand || KO || 4 || 

|-  style="background:#cfc;"
| 1970-08-12 || Win||align=left| Samran Bangyikhan||  Rajadamnern Stadium || Bangkok, Thailand || TKO || 2 || 

|-  style="background:#cfc;"
| 1970-07-22 || Win||align=left| Yod Saksuwan||  Rajadamnern Stadium || Bangkok, Thailand || TKO || 1 || 

|-  style="background:#cfc;"
| 1970-06-28|| Win||align=left| Phichisuk Changyon||  Rajadamnern Stadium || Bangkok, Thailand || Decision || 5 || 3:00 

|-  style="background:#cfc;"
| 1970-05-21 || Win||align=left| Sakchon Sophy||  Rajadamnern Stadium || Bangkok, Thailand || KO || 3 || 

|-  style="background:#cfc;"
| 1970-04-20 || Win||align=left| Pinai Sornphajon|| Rajadamnern Stadium  || Bangkok, Thailand || TKO || 4 || 

|-  style="background:#cfc;"
| 1970-03-30 || Win||align=left| Kraingern Lukakatyothin||   Rajadamnern Stadium|| Bangkok, Thailand || KO  || 3 || 

|-  style="background:#cfc;"
| 1970-03-02 || Win||align=left| Sriamnuay Sornprasit||  Rajadamnern Stadium || Bangkok, Thailand || TKO  || 5 || 

|-  style="background:#cfc;"
| 1970-02-09 || Win||align=left| Pokaew Sitsripai||  Rajadamnern Stadium|| Bangkok, Thailand || Decision || 5 || 3:00

|-  style="background:#cfc;"
| 1970-01-06 || Win||align=left| Phanomchai Sor Uthai || Rajadamnern Stadium || Bangkok, Thailand || KO (Punches) || 1 || 
|-
| colspan=9 | Legend:

See also 
 List of WBC world champions
 List of super lightweight boxing champions

References

External links 
 

1950 births
2009 deaths
Light-welterweight boxers
World Boxing Council champions
World boxing champions
Deaths from liver failure
Deaths from bowel obstruction
Saensak Muangsurin
Saensak Muangsurin
Saensak Muangsurin
Southpaw boxers
World light-welterweight boxing champions
Southeast Asian Games medalists in boxing
Saensak Muangsurin